The 2017–18 season will be the 119th season of competitive association football in Hungary.

National teams

Hungary national football team

2018 FIFA World Cup qualification (UEFA) Group B

Hungary women's national football team

UEFA competitions

2017–18 UEFA Champions League

Second qualifying round

2017–18 UEFA Europa League

Qualifying rounds

First qualifying round

Second qualifying round

References